Rawez Farhad Lawan (born 4 October 1987) is a Swedish former professional footballer of Kurdish descent who played primarily as a midfielder.

Lawan joined AC Horsens in the summer of 2006, and played an important role in the club's successful struggle against relegation during the 2006–07 Danish Superliga season.

In summer 2009 he signed a 4-year contract with FC Nordsjælland.

On 7 January 2013 he signed a 3-year deal with Swedish side IFK Norrköping.

On 18 December 2006 Lawan was called up for the Sweden U21 team.

Honours

Club
 Allsvenskan:
 Winners: 2015
 Danish Superliga:
 Winners: 2011–12
 Danish Cup:
 Winners (2): 2009–10, 2010–11

External links
 Profile at FCN.dk 
 Swedish U-21 NT stats 
 
 

1987 births
Living people
Swedish footballers
Malmö FF players
AC Horsens players
Kvarnby IK players
FC Nordsjælland players
IFK Norrköping players
Dalkurd FF players
Vasalunds IF players
Allsvenskan players
Superettan players
Ettan Fotboll players
Danish Superliga players
Swedish expatriate footballers
Expatriate men's footballers in Denmark
Kurdish sportspeople
Swedish people of Iraqi descent
Swedish people of Kurdish descent
Association football forwards
Footballers from Malmö